Alpha Mountain is a  summit located in the Tantalus Range, in Tantalus Provincial Park, in southwestern British Columbia, Canada. Its nearest higher peak is Serratus Mountain,  to the west. The Serratus Glacier lies to the west of Alpha, unnamed glaciers lie on the northern and eastern slopes, and Lake Lovely Water lies below the south slope. Precipitation runoff from the peak drains into tributaries of the Squamish River.

History
The first ascent of the mountain was made in 1914 by Basil Darling and Alan Morkill via the southwest ridge. These two named the peak shortly after they made the ascent, alluding to Alpha, which is the first letter of the Greek alphabet, because the peak is the first (southeast) summit of the Alpha-Serratus-Tantalus-Zenith Ridge, and also because of its form. The mountain's toponym was officially adopted on June 6, 1957, by the Geographical Names Board of Canada.

Climate

Based on the Köppen climate classification, Alpha Mountain is located in the marine west coast climate zone of western North America. Most weather fronts originate in the Pacific Ocean, and travel east toward the Coast Mountains where they are forced upward by the range (Orographic lift), causing them to drop their moisture in the form of rain or snowfall. As a result, the Coast Mountains experience high precipitation, especially during the winter months in the form of snowfall. Winter temperatures can drop below −20 °C with wind chill factors below −30 °C. The months July through September offer the most favorable weather for climbing Alpha.

Climbing Routes

Established rock climbing routes on Alpha Mountain:

 Southwest Ridge -  First Ascent 1914
 East Ridge -   FA 1916 
 Northeast Ridge -  FA 1968 
 Northwest Ridge -  FA 1969
 North Buttress -  FA 1981  
 South Face -

See also

 Geography of British Columbia
 Geology of British Columbia

References

External links
 Weather: Alpha Mountain
 YouTube: Climbing Alpha Mountain
 Vimeo: Climbing Alpha East Ridge

Two-thousanders of British Columbia
Pacific Ranges
Sea-to-Sky Corridor
New Westminster Land District